Mu Ramaswamy is an Indian theatre artist, professor of drama, and actor best known for his dramas Durgira Avalam, a Tamil adaptation of Sophocles' Antigone, and Kalagakkarar Thozhar Periyar, a biography of the life of Periyar. He later moved on to playing major roles in Tamil films starting with  Joker (2016) and K.D. (2019).

Career

Theatrical career 
Ramaswamy began his career by pursuing a Ph.D in theatrical drama. He created the theatrical group  ‘Nija Nataka Iyakkam' (‘Real Theatre Movement') and staged several plays. His interest in acting has led him to stage several plays in Tamil including Durgira Avalam and Kalagakkarar Thozhar Periyar. Ramaswamy has also translated several dramas into Tamil due to his love for Tamil, which resulted from him growing up during the Dravidian movement. Some of the plays that he has translated includes plays by G. Sankara Pillai and Bertolt Brecht.

Film career 
Nassar noticed his stage talent and offered Ramaswamy supporting roles in his films Devathai and Maayan. After playing supporting roles in several films, Ramaswamy started playing major roles starting with Joker and K.D.

Plays 
 Gangayin Mainthan
 Pandithar Moovarum Mandathoru Singamum
Padukavalan
Durgira Avalam - Tamil adaptation of Antigone
 Kalagakkarar Thozhar Periyar as Periyar
 Ponniyin Selvan as Periya Pazhuvettaraiyar

Filmography

Films 
All films are in Tamil, unless otherwise noted.

Television

References

External links 
 

Living people
Indian film actors
Indian Tamil people
Actors in Tamil cinema
21st-century Indian actors
Actors from Tamil Nadu
Male actors in Tamil cinema
Actors in Tamil theatre
Year of birth missing (living people)